Godalming railway station is a stop on the Portsmouth Direct Line,  down the line from . The station, opened in 1859 to replace one on a different site, is situated at the edge of the town of Godalming, Surrey. The main station building is a Grade II listed building.

History
The original single platform terminus station, opened in 1849, was located on a spur from just south of Farncombe station, north of the River Wey. It was closed to passengers in 1897 but was retained as a goods yard until 1969.

Station environment and awards
The staff at Godalming have worked hard to maintain the station. In 2004 they won Best Miscellaneous Building in the Godalming in Bloom 2004 Competition, in 2005 they won Best Small Station in the South West Trains Station Pride Awards and received a Highly Commended in the National Rail Awards.

In July 2006 the station won the Special Award in the Godalming in Bloom 2006 competition, not only for their display of flowers, but also for the welcoming environment they have created. It won again in 2008.

In August 2006 they won Best Small Station in the 2006 South West Trains Station Pride Awards.

In popular culture
In February 2006 Godalming station was renamed "Shere" for three days while filming took place for The Holiday, a film starring Cameron Diaz, Jude Law, Jack Black and Kate Winslet. It was directed by Nancy Meyers and released in December 2006.

2016 accessibility project

The pedestrian subway connecting the platforms is a narrow passageway with limited accessibility, typical of the era of the construction of the station.  It provided a challenging route for the disabled, as well as prams and passengers encumbered with luggage, potentially requiring a lengthy detour outside the station to access the London-bound platform.  As one of relatively few subways of the era still in use, it suffered from dampness and poor sight lines, and had become relatively dilapidated.

In 2016 Godalming station was therefore allocated £3.1m of funding under the government 'Access for All' funding programme to replace the subway with a fully enclosed footbridge, equipped with two 16-person lifts to enable step free access between platforms.  Other works funded under the programme include replacement and extension of the cycle shelters, platform canopy extensions to provide a weather protected route between the new footbridge structure and existing canopies, and resurfacing of the platforms to provide tactile paving and improve the stepping distance between platform and train.

Services
All services at Godalming are operated by South Western Railway using  and  EMUs.

The typical off-peak service in trains per hour is:
 4 tph to  via 

Gallery

References

External links 

The River Wey and Wey Navigations Community Site — a non-commercial site of over 200,000 words all about the Wey Navigations and includes extensive information and images about Godalming.

Railway stations in Surrey
DfT Category C2 stations
Former London and South Western Railway stations
Railway stations in Great Britain opened in 1859
Railway stations served by South Western Railway
Grade II listed buildings in Surrey
Godalming